The 2014 Nordic Opening or the first Lillehammer Triple was the 5th edition of the Nordic Opening, an annual cross-country skiing mini-tour event. The three-day event was the second competition round of the 2014–15 FIS Cross-Country World Cup.

World Cup points distribution 
The winners of the overall standings were awarded 200 World Cup points and the winners of each of the three stages were awarded 50 World Cup points.

A total of 350 points was possible to achieve if one athlete won all three stages and the overall standings.

Overall standings

Overall leadership by stage

References 

2014–15 FIS Cross-Country World Cup
2014
2014 in cross-country skiing
December 2014 sports events in Europe